Bart Vale (born May 4, 1957) is an American former kickboxer, mixed martial artist and professional wrestler. He is known for his "old school" American martial arts look, consisting of a mustache, mullet and American flag trunks.

Career
Bart Vale began his martial arts training in 1970 with kenpo. He later traveled to Japan where he was a professional wrestler in the Pro Wrestling Fujiwara Gumi (a shoot-style professional wrestling organization) champion for close to three years. In Japan, he also studied a number of other styles and coined the term "shootfighting", a martial art that combines striking and grappling. He co-founded the International Shootfighting Association and in 1992, began the Shootfighting World Championships.

Vale began participating in events for Fighting Network Rings in March 1993. He appeared in five matches for Rings, four of which took place during the organization's pro wrestling period. Rings began promoting mixed martial arts bouts rather than shoot-style works in 1995.

In October 1995, Vale competed in the World Combat Championships. In the first round of the tournament he defeated Mike Bitonio via first-round submission. Fighting at 260 lbs, Vale outweighed Bitonio by 45 lbs. Vale was to face Renzo Gracie in the semifinals, but wasn't able to continue due to head lacerations. He had two further MMA bouts, in which he lost to Kazunari Murakami and Dan Severn. He also competed in the K-1 kickboxing promotion twice. In 1996, he was invited into the K-1 World Grand Prix and was defeated by Andy Hug. His next bout, against Nobuaki Kakuda in 1998, also ended in defeat. In the early days of MMA, when it was still called NHB, Vale was introduced as the man who beat Ken Shamrock in reference to a pro wrestling bout that occurred in Pro Wrestling Fujiwara Gumi on May 15, 1992.

Kickboxing record

|-
|
|Loss
| Nobuaki Kakuda
|K-1 Japan '98 Kamikaze
|Tokyo, Japan
|TKO (doctor stoppage)
|align="center"|1
|align="center"|2:09
|0-2
|
|-
|
|Loss
| Andy Hug
|K-1 Grand Prix '96 Opening Battle
|Yokohama, Japan
|TKO (3 knockdowns)
|align="center"|1
|align="center"|2:24
|0-1
|
|-
|-
| colspan=10 | Legend:

Mixed martial arts record

|-
|Loss
|align=center| 1–2
|Dan Severn
|TKO (doctor stoppage)
|CFA 1: Collision at the Crossroads
|
|align=center|2
|align=center|0:36
|Corinth, Mississippi, United States
|
|-
|Loss
|align=center| 1–1
|Kazunari Murakami
|TKO (punches)
|Extreme Fighting 3
|
|align=center|1
|align=center|4:37
|Tulsa, Oklahoma, United States
|
|-
|Win
|align=center| 1–0
|Mike Bitonio
|Submission (arm-triangle choke)
|World Combat Championship 1: First Strike
|
|align=center|1
|align=center|7:10
|Charlotte, North Carolina, United States
|

See also
 Shootfighting
 Shoot wrestling
 Mixed martial arts

References

External links
 
 
 Official K-1 profile
 YouTube

1957 births
Living people
American male karateka
American male kickboxers
Kickboxers from Florida
Heavyweight kickboxers
American male mixed martial artists
Mixed martial artists from Florida
Heavyweight mixed martial artists
Mixed martial artists utilizing American Kenpo
Mixed martial artists utilizing wrestling
Mixed martial artists utilizing shootfighting
American male professional wrestlers
Sportspeople from Miami